Schwarzberg (from German: black mountain) is the name of several mountains and places:

Schwarzberg (Lepontine Alps), a mountain in Switzerland
Schwarzberg (Vogtland), a mountain in Germany
Schwarzberg Glacier, a glacier in Switzerland

See also
Schwarzberghorn